A Legislative Assembly election was held in 2016 for the 294 seats (out of 295 seats) of the  Vidhan Sabha (Vidhān Sabhā) in the state of West Bengal in India. The All India Trinamool Congress under Mamata Banerjee won 211 seats, and thus was reelected with an enhanced majority. Like in the 2011 election, the poll was held in six phases, with the first phase divided into two days. The first phase was held in Naxalite-Maoist affected Red corridor areas with two polling dates: 4 April and 11 April. The other phases were held on 17, 21, 25, 30 April and 5 May. The result of the election was declared on 19 May.

In the previous election in 2011, the All India Trinamool Congress in a coalition with INC won a majority and ended the 34-year rule of the Left Front government.

Background 
In the previous assembly election in 2011, the All India Trinamool Congress, under the leadership of Mamata Banerjee, won a majority and ended the 34-year rule of the Left Front government. During 2011 election, the main theme of TMC was paribartan (meaning "change"), implying it was time to change the Left Front reign of 34-years in the state. However, during the five year rule of TMC, urban population, in particular, were in general unhappy with the changes made by the government.  Also, newspapers reported that chief minister Banerjee has been only trying to consolidate votes from the sizable Muslim minority.

In January 2016, the Election Commission of India urged the central government to allow it to carry out a limited delimitation exercise in West Bengal to ensure voting rights to people who came to India following the exchange of enclaves between India and Bangladesh. As per updated voter list for the year 2016 published by the Election Commission of India in January 2016, West Bengal has surpassed the rest of the country in elector-population ratio with 0.68. The final electoral roll in West Bengal for 2016 with 6.55 crore voters has 3.39 crore male and 3.16 crore female voters.

Major issues

Prior to the West Bengal elections, on 3 January 2016, a mob turned violent and vandalised Kaliachak Police station, block development office and public property in Kaliachak, Malda district. Mamata Banerjee's government was severely criticised for not handling the situation better.

The Saradha Group financial scandal, the Narada Sting operation (which showcased the ministers of the ruling party of accepting bribes), lack of any major industrial investments, and law & order issue surfaced as major issues and proved to be an acid test for Trinamool Congress. The Kolkata flyover collapse also happened during the poll process.

Schedule 
Assembly elections in West Bengal are to be held in phases from 4 April to 5 May 2016.

Election dates by constituency

On 4 March 2016, Election Commission of India announced that 22 assembly constituencies in West Bengal would have Voter-verified paper audit trail (VVPAT) machines attached along with EVMs. Voter-verified paper audit trail (VVPAT) machines were to be in place in more than 5,993 polling stations.

Candidates and Contesting Parties

Candidates 
AITC released its candidate list on 5 March, the same day the elections were announced.

On 10 March, BJP released its first candidate list of 52 members.

Left Front consisting of CPI(M), CPI, RSP and All India Forward Bloc along with INC (Congress) (who were on an Electoral agreement with the Left Front) released their respective candidate list in several rounds after consultations and bargaining.

Contesting Parties 
Trinamool Congress+
All India Trinamool Congress (AITC)
Jana Andolan Party

Mahajot (Left Front + United Progressive Alliance) 
Communist Party of India (Marxist) (CPIM)
Communist Party of India (CPI)
Revolutionary Socialist Party (RSP)
All India Forward Bloc (AIFB)
Revolutionary Communist Party of India (RCPI)
Marxist Forward Bloc (MFB)
Democratic Socialist Party (DSP(PC))
Indian National Congress (INC) 
Party of Democratic Socialism (PDS) 
Rashtriya Janata Dal (RJD)
Janata Dal (United) (JD(U)) 
Nationalist Congress Party (NCP) 
Communist Party of Bharat (CPB)
Bharat Nirman Party (Led by Lakshman Chandra Seth)
Save Democracy Forum
Independent Candidate

National Democratic Alliance

Bharatiya Janata Party (BJP)
Gorkha Janmukti Morcha (GJM)

Alliance(s) 
Following the heavy defeats in the 2011 Assembly elections and the 2014 Indian General Election, the Communist Party of India (Marxist) welcomed ideas of the alliance even with parties not conforming to the communist ideology in general. The first signs came in the Siliguri Municipal Corporation election in 2015, when the CPI(M) made some local understanding with Congress to keep TMC and BJP out of power; resulting in CPI(M) leader Ashok Bhattacharya being appointed as the Mayor of Siliguri. This success then got popularity as 'Siliguri Model'.

After the success of the model, in the long run, some Congress and CPI(M) leaders advocated for a Left-Congress alliance. This gradually materialized into "Alliance" between INC and Left Front in all the seats except a few in Murshidabad and Maldah.

After much dispute and secession of SUCI(C) and CPI(ML) from the Left Front, both Congress and Lefts formed an understanding basis of what they called "seat-sharing", strongly objecting to the use of the word-"alliance".

On the other hand, the ruling All India Trinamool Congress announced its candidate list for all the 294 seats, as they were fighting alone this time. But after the announcement, the candidate from Kalimpong and former Gorkha Janmukti Morcha leader, Harka Bahadur Chettri, stated that he will fight as an Independent candidate under the entity of his newly formed political party, Jana Andolan Party, and will be supported by the Trinamool Congress.

The BJP announced its candidate list for 291 seats in several phases, leaving 3 seats of the Darjeeling Hills for their allies, the Gorkha Janmukti Morcha.







Voting
79.22% voting was recorded in the third phase of West Bengal polls held on 21 April 2016.
79.51% voting was recorded in second phase of West Bengal polls.

Surveys and polls

Exit poll

Result

Results by Parties
The election results were announced along with other four state assemblies on 19 May 2016. AITC won 211 seats, and thus was reelected with an enhanced majority. They also became the first ruling party to win without an ally since 1962 in West Bengal.

! colspan="2" rowspan="2" |Parties and coalitions
! colspan="3" |Popular vote
! colspan="3" |Seats
|- valign="top"
! Votes 
!%||±pp|| Contested || Won ||+/−
|-
| 
|All India Trinamool Congress (AITC) ||24,564,523
|44.91
|5.98||293 || 211
||
|-
| 
| Communist Party of India (Marxist) (CPM)  ||10,802,058
|19.75||||148||26
||14
|-
| 
| Indian National Congress (INC)
|6,700,938
|12.25|||3.15||92|| 44
||2
|-
| 
|Bharatiya Janata Party (BJP) ||5,555,134
|10.16||5.56||291||3
||3
|-
| 
|All India Forward Bloc (AIFB)
|1,543,764
|2.82
|1.98
|25
|2
|9
|-
| 
|Independents (IND)||1,184,047
|2.16||0.97|| 371
|1
||1 
|-
| 
|Revolutionary Socialist Party (RSP)
|911,004
|1.67
|1.33
|19
|3
|4
|-
| 
|Communist Party of India (CPI)
|791,925
|1.45
|0.35
|11
|1
|1
|-
| 
|Socialist Unity Centre of India (SUCI)||365,996
|0.67||0.23|| 182
|0
||1 
|-
| 
|Gorkha Janmukti Morcha (GOJAM)
|254,626
|0.47
|0.25
|5
|3
|
|-
| 
|Democratic Socialist Party (DSP)
|167,576
|0.31
|0.04
|2
|0
|1 
|-
| 
|Nationalist Congress Party (NCP)
|69,898
|0.13
|0.10
|1
|0
|
|-
| 
|Samajwadi Party (SP)
|46,402
|0.08
|0.66
|23
|0
|1 
|-
| 
|Rashtriya Janata Dal (RJD)
|15,439
|0.03
|0.02
|1
|0
|
|-
| 
|None of the Above (NOTA)
|831,848
|1.52
|1.52
| colspan="3" bgcolor="#E9E9E9" |
|-
|- class="unsortable" style="background-color:#E9E9E9"
! colspan="9" |
|-
| colspan="2" |Total|| 54,697,791
|100.0
| bgcolor="#E9E9E9" |
|2255
| 294 ||±0
|-
! colspan="9" |
|-
| style="text-align:left;" colspan="2" |Valid votes
| align="right" |54,697,791
| align="right" |99.92
| colspan="4" rowspan="5" style="background-color:#E9E9E9"  |
|-
| style="text-align:left;" colspan="2" |Invalid votes
| align="right" |44,622
| align="right" |0.08
|-
| style="text-align:left;" colspan="2" |Votes cast / turnout
| align="right" |54,742,413
| align="right" |83.02
|-
| style="text-align:left;" colspan="2" |Abstentions
| align="right" | 11,196,593
| align="right" |16.98
|-
| style="text-align:left;" colspan="2" |Registered voters
| align="right" | 65,939,006
|colspan="1" style="background-color:#E9E9E9"|
|-
|}

Results by District Wise

Results by Constituency

See also 
 Elections in India
 2016 elections in India
 List of constituencies of West Bengal Legislative Assembly
 2019 Indian general election in West Bengal

References

External links
 West Bangal General Legislative Election Results at the Election Commission of India

2016 State Assembly elections in India
2016
2010s in West Bengal
April 2016 events in India
May 2016 events in India